This list of botanical gardens and arboretums in New Hampshire is intended to include all significant botanical gardens and arboretums in the U.S. state of New Hampshire

See also
List of botanical gardens and arboretums in the United States

References 

 
Arboreta in New Hampshire
botanical gardens and arboretums in New Hampshire